225th may refer to:

225th (Kootenay) Battalion, CEF, a unit in the Canadian Expeditionary Force during the First World War
225th Brigade Support Battalion, a United States Army unit based at Schofield Barracks, Hawaii
225th Combat Communications Squadron (225 CBCS) is an Air National Guard combat communications unit located at Gadsden, Alabama
225th Engineer Brigade (United States), a combat heavy engineer brigade of the Louisiana Army National Guard
225th Independent Infantry Brigade (Home), a British Army formation during World War II
225th Street (IRT White Plains Road Line), a local station on the IRT White Plains Road Line of the New York City Subway
Marble Hill – 225th Street (IRT Broadway – Seventh Avenue Line), a local station on the New York City Subway

See also
225 (number)
225, the year 225 (CCXXV) of the Julian calendar